Fritz W. Ermarth has been the Director of National Security Programs at the Nixon Center since 2002.  He is also a part-time senior analyst for the Strategies Group at Science Applications International Corporation.

Ermarth worked for the Central Intelligence Agency from 1973 until 1998, serving as Chairman of the National Intelligence Council, as National Intelligence Officer for the USSR and East Europe and Director of the Strategic Evaluation Center.  He has received both the Distinguished Intelligence Medal and the National Intelligence Distinguished Service Medal.  Ermarth also served as Special Assistant to the President during the Ronald Reagan's presidency, as well as Senior Director of Soviet and European Affairs.

Following the 1990s looting of Russia, he stated "We have outright criminals at one end, but at the other end we call them statesmen."

Ermarth died on January 19, 2022.

Footnotes

References 

1941 births
Harvard University alumni
Living people
People of the Central Intelligence Agency
Recipients of the Distinguished Intelligence Medal
Recipients of the National Intelligence Distinguished Service Medal
Wittenberg University alumni